The Alliance of Evil is a group of supervillains appearing in American comic books published by Marvel Comics.

Publication history
The Alliance of Evil first appeared in X-Factor #5-6 (June–July 1986), and was created by writer Bob Layton and artist Jackson Guice. Two of its members, Tower and Frenzy, had appeared before the rest of the team.

The team subsequently appears in X-Factor #33 (October 1988), and New Mutants Annual #7 (1991).

The Alliance of Evil received an entry in the Official Handbook of the Marvel Universe Update '89 #1.

Fictional team biography
The Alliance of Evil was once Apocalypse's personal strike force, and carried out his bidding.  Their first mission was to find and capture Michael Nowlan, a mutant with the ability to heighten other mutants' powers.  When Nowlan tried to leave, they kidnapped his girlfriend, Suzy, to use as bait.  X-Factor found Nowlan and vowed to protect him. When the Alliance traced him down, they threatened Suzy to make him power them up. The Alliance fought and defeated X-Factor, bringing Nowlan back to their master. X-Factor eventually found their hideout, and on Apocalypse's orders Nowlan powered up the Alliance again.  When Suzy tried to escape, Stinger's bolts accidentally kill her.  Nowlan killed himself, and Apocalypse abandoned the Alliance of Evil and escaped.

Much later, the Alliance of Evil caused a commotion over the Mutant Registration Act.  X-Factor saw them on the news and immediately attacked the Alliance. They were defeated by X-Factor and taken into custody by Freedom Force.

The group, minus Timeshadow, later encountered the New Mutants, along with Harness and Piecemeal.  They were defeated, and when questioned later, Frenzy admitted to being hired by A.I.M. to bodyguard Harness and Piecemeal.  She was then dropped out of a helicopter.

The group eventually disbanded.  Frenzy went on to join the ranks of Magneto's Acolytes and later the X-Men themselves, Tower was killed by the X-Cutioner, Stinger was seen befriending Iceman on the X-Men's home island of Utopia,
and Timeshadow has not been seen since.

Members

Employers
 Apocalypse (En Sabah Nur)
Piecemeal (Gilbert Benson) - son of Harness

Agents
 Frenzy (Joanna Cargill) - field leader of the Alliance, a super-strong mutant with steel-hard skin and resistance to temperature extremes.  At first glance, she seems like your typical strongwoman, but she is actually quite intelligent.  She later went on to join Magneto and his Acolytes, and eventually mind-controlled to join the X-Men. She had returned to the Acolytes after Exdous reformed the group, having retained her mutant powers, but now resides on Utopia.
 Tower (Edward Pasternak) - a mutant with the ability to increase his size and strength.  He is probably the most reckless out of the group, and isn't very bright.  Tower was killed by the mutant-hunting X-Cutioner. Resurrected by Selene.
 Stinger (Wendy Sherman)- a young valley girl with electricity control. Recently seen on Utopia.
 Timeshadow - who had the mutant power to phase into time, allowing himself to teleport in a way, or appear to be in several places at once. His current status and whereabouts are unknown.
 Source (Michael Nowlan) - A drug addict mutant who radiated pulses of energy that supercharged superhuman abilities or drove them out of their owner's control. This energy was highly addictive. Nowlanwas captured and forced to "join". Currently deceased.

References

Comics characters introduced in 1986
X-Men supporting characters